Los Angeles has been home to many new and established music bands. Some of the bands originating from greater Los Angeles, including Orange County and the Inland Empire, include:

0-9

A

B

C

D

E

F

G

H

I

J
 Jack Mack and the Heart Attack
 Jack's Mannequin
 Jan and Dean
 Jane's Addiction

K
 Keel
 Kid Frost
 King Kobra
 Kitten
 Kommunity FK
 Mike Krol
 Kush
 Kyuss
 The Kids of Widney High

L

M

N

O

P

Q
 Queens of the Stone Age
 Quetzal
 Quiet Riot

R

S

T

U

V

W

X
 X
 X-Sinner
 XYZ

Y
 Yellowjackets
 Young the Giant
 The Young Veins
 Youth Brigade

Z
 Frank Zappa
 The Zeros

See also
 List of musicians from the Inland Empire

References

 
Los Angeles
Bands
Lists of bands